All Girl Summer Fun Band is the debut studio album by All Girl Summer Fun Band, released in 2002.

Track listing
All songs written by Kim Baxter, Ari Douangpanya, Kathy Foster, and Jen Sbragia.
"Brooklyn Phone Call" – 1:51
"Canadian Boyfriend" – 2:35
"Car Trouble" – 1:39
"Later Operator" – 2:26
"Cut Your Hair" – 2:20
"Somehow Angels" – 2:42
"Theme Song" – 1:08
"It's There" – 2:43
"Girl No. 3" – 2:50
"Stumble Over My" – 1:50
"New in Town" – 2:28
"Cutie Pie" – 1:28
"Cell Phone" – 1:00

References

2002 debut albums
All Girl Summer Fun Band albums
K Records albums